This is a list of Nigerian films released in 2004.

Films

See also
List of Nigerian films

References

External links
2004 films at the Internet Movie Database

2004
Lists of 2004 films by country or language
Films